German revolution can refer to:

German revolutions of 1848–1849, a series of loosely coordinated protests and rebellions in the states of the German Confederation
German Revolution of 1918–1919, a civil conflict in the German Empire at the end of the First World War
Peaceful Revolution, 1989–90 in East Germany, the process of sociopolitical change that led to the reunification of Germany

See also
German reunification
November 1918: A German Revolution, a tetralogy of books by Alfred Döblin, published 1933–1945
Revolution and Counter-Revolution in Germany, an 1896 book by Friedrich Engels with contributions from Karl Marx